The American Autonomic Society is a scientific society with a particular focus on clinical aspects of the autonomic nervous system. Its official journal, Clinical Autonomic Research, is published by Springer Science+Business Media.

See also 
 International Society for Autonomic Neuroscience

External links 
 
 Clinical Autonomic Research

Neuroscience organizations